Alexis M. Hansen (née Lloyd; born 1960) is an American politician, currently serving as a member of the Nevada Assembly from the 32nd district.

Early life and education
Hansen was born Alexis Lloyd on 1960 in Sacramento, California. In 1978, Hansen graduated from Sparks High School. Later, she graduated from University of Nevada, Reno.

Career
Hansen has been the co-owner of Hansen & Sons Plumbing since 1986. She has been a member of the National Rifle Association since 2017. In 2018, Hansen was elected to the Nevada Assembly, where she has been representing the 32nd district since November 7, 2018. Hansen is a Republican.

Personal life
Alexis is married to fellow politician, Ira D. Hansen. Together, they have eight children and eighteen grandchildren. Alexis resides in Sparks, Nevada. She is a member of the Church of Jesus Christ of Latter-day Saints.

References

Living people
1960 births
Politicians from Sacramento, California
Politicians from Sparks, Nevada
University of Nevada, Reno alumni
Latter Day Saints from Nevada
Republican Party members of the Nevada Assembly
Women state legislators in Nevada
21st-century American politicians
21st-century American women politicians